The Davao del Norte Sports and Tourism Complex (DNSTC) is a sports complex in Tagum, Davao del Norte, Philippines, and is the largest sports complex in the Davao region. It was built on the area of the former Davao Sports Complex, torn down by fire in 2003. Construction began and ended on two significant dates: 11-11-11 (11 November 2011) and 12-12-12 (12 December 2012).

The complex is the main hub for the 2015 Palarong Pambansa events, including the opening and closing ceremonies.

The stadium is now the home of Philippines Football League outfit Davao Aguilas F.C. since their founding in 2017.

History
A previous sports facility called the Davao Sports Complex stood in the lot where the future DNSTC is to be built; the old sports complex consisted of two wooden grandstands and a partially-covered gymnasium, with a gravel athletics track, a partially-turfed football field, and a gravel baseball diamond. The lot was then used as a motocross track.

In 2007, plans were being made to reconstruct the sports complex using better materials with an avant-garde design, with the aim of building the most modern sports facility throughout the Philippines. The initial design was drawn up and presented in 2008; this was designed by Sol U. Flores (who also designed the New City Hall of Tagum). The initial cost for the reconstruction project amounted to PHP350 million. However, the financial crisis of 2007–2008 caused the prices for the project materials (which were mostly imported) to exceed the budget. This prompted the provincial government to use the budget for other services.

In 2011, Davao del Norte Governor Rodolfo P. Del Rosario revived the project as part of the province's bid to host the 2015 Palarong Pambansa, but this time it followed a more conventional design. Project cost amounted to PHP 243 million. Construction began on 11 November 2011 and was completed on the target date of 12 December 2012.

The Provincial Government plans to construct a sports academy within the DNSTC after the 2015 Palarong Pambansa in order to support the province's sports development programs for its homegrown athletes and athletes throughout Mindanao and the entire country as well.

After confirming its participation in the Philippines Football League, the Davao Aguilas announced that they will be using the stadium as their home ground for the PFL.

Facilities

oval track

The complex has several sporting facilities including a 3,000-capacity main grand stand, an rubberized eight-track athletics oval, an Aquatic Center featuring a ten-lane Olympic size swimming pool (50 meters) with a warm up pool (12 meters) that has a grandstand with 500 person capacity, two lawn tennis courts, an air-conditioned multi-purpose gymnasium (Rodolfo P. Del Rosario Gymnasium, RDR Gymnasium) that can be used for indoor games, two football fields (one inside the track oval and one beside it) and a club house.

The complex also has a lighting system for night events consisting of four light towers with high-intensity bulbs and additional LED lights on the main grandstand, allowing for late afternoon to night events to be conducted.

The main grandstand has several multi-purpose rooms that can used for other indoor games such as table tennis or chess, or be used as work rooms, storage rooms for equipment, clinics, or food distribution centers. A VIP Lounge with a holding room is provided for visiting dignitaries and special guests. 
Offices for the Provincial Sports Office and the Building and a sub-office for the Ground Maintenance Division of the Provincial General Services Office are located in the main grandstand and Aquatic Center grandstand, respectively.

The clubhouse features a canteen operated by the provincial government employees' cooperative, an open-air dining area, and an air-conditioned conference room; it can be rented for special events by individuals or groups through a reservation with the cooperative.

In order to accommodate more events during the 2015 Palarong Pambansa, an additional football field and archery range were added. Both are provided with steel bleachers and viewing areas to accommodate a small audience.

Tourism Village
The DavNor Pasalubong Shop and Tourism Village are located behind the RDR Gymnasium and Aquatic Center. A covered area with lights and sound fixtures is available for night events such as concerts. The area also has spaces where tenants can set up their stalls and sell their products.

Uses

The sports complex will operate as a multi-use sports venue, capable of hosting regional, national sports events such as the Palarong Pambansa and the Private Schools Athletic Association (PRISAA) National Competition, and even international events such as the Southeast Asian Games or the Asian Games. The Tourism Village is used for all tourism-related activities by the Provincial Government. Future developments in the site include the Davao del Norte Sports Academy and inclusion of additional tourist and shopping centers.

The stadium is also the home ground of the Davao Aguilas F.C. of the Philippines Football League.

References

External links

Athletics (track and field) venues in the Philippines
Football venues in the Philippines
Swimming venues in the Philippines
Buildings and structures in Tagum
Sports in Davao del Norte
Sports complexes in the Philippines